A crudo alemán or bistec alemán ("raw German" or "German beefsteak") is a typical German-Chilean dish similar to a steak tartare. It is made by putting finely chopped raw beef mince onto a piece of pre-sliced white bread and then adding lemon juice, chopped onions and a sauce made of yogurt and mayonnaise.

Most probably it is derived from the German Mett, a preparation of minced pork, also served with chopped onions.
The predominance of cattle farming in southern Chile in contrast to pig farming in Central Europe eventually led to a local adaptation, using beef instead of pork to recreate this traditional dish.

See also
 List of beef dishes

References

Sources
Stephan Küeffner and Kristina Schreck. Frommer's Chile & Easter Island. 2007. Page 253.

Chilean cuisine
German-Chilean culture
German cuisine
Raw beef dishes